Edis Kurtić (born 14 September 1976) is a Bosnian-Herzegovinian former professional football player.

External links
 

1976 births
Living people
Association football midfielders
Bosnia and Herzegovina footballers
FC Moscow players
FK Budućnost Banovići players
NK Žepče players
Russian Premier League players
Premier League of Bosnia and Herzegovina players
First League of the Federation of Bosnia and Herzegovina players
Bosnia and Herzegovina expatriate footballers
Expatriate footballers in Russia
Bosnia and Herzegovina expatriate sportspeople in Russia